Ehsan Khan (born 27 December 1984) is a Hong Kong cricketer. He made his first-class cricket debut against Ireland in the 2015–17 ICC Intercontinental Cup on 30 August 2016. He made his Twenty20 International (T20I) debut against Ireland on 5 September 2016. He made his One Day International (ODI) debut against Scotland on 8 September 2016, taking a wicket with his very first delivery.

On 8 March 2018, during the 2018 Cricket World Cup Qualifier match against Afghanistan at Bulawayo Athletic Club, Bulawayo, Khan took 4 wickets for 33 runs. Hong Kong went on to win the match by 30 runs, under the Duckworth–Lewis method, and Khan was named the player of the match. It was Hong Kong's first win against a Full Member side in an ODI match. Following the conclusion of the Cricket World Cup Qualifier tournament, the International Cricket Council (ICC) named Khan as the rising star of Hong Kong's squad.

In August 2018, he was named in Hong Kong's squad for the 2018 Asia Cup Qualifier tournament. Hong Kong won the qualifier tournament, and he was then named in Hong Kong's squad for the 2018 Asia Cup.

In December 2018, he was named in Hong Kong's team for the 2018 ACC Emerging Teams Asia Cup. In April 2019, he was named in Hong Kong's squad for the 2019 ICC World Cricket League Division Two tournament in Namibia. He was named as one of the six players to watch during the tournament.

In September 2019, he was named in Hong Kong's squad for the 2019 ICC T20 World Cup Qualifier tournament in the United Arab Emirates. In November 2019, he was named in Hong Kong's squad for the 2019 ACC Emerging Teams Asia Cup in Bangladesh. Later the same month, he was named in Hong Kong's squad for the Cricket World Cup Challenge League B tournament in Oman. In May 2022, he was named in Hong Kong's side for the 2022 Uganda Cricket World Cup Challenge League B tournament.

References

External links
 

1984 births
Living people
Hong Kong cricketers
Hong Kong One Day International cricketers
Hong Kong Twenty20 International cricketers
Place of birth missing (living people)